Lisa Raymond and Rennae Stubbs were the defending champions, but decided not to participate this year.

Lori McNeil and Kimberly Po won the title, defeating Chanda Rubin and Sandrine Testud 6–7(3–7), 7–5, 6–4 in the final.

Seeds

Draw

References
Main Draw

Challenge Bell
Tournoi de Québec
Can